Pavel Chernook (born September 28, 1986) is a Belarusian professional ice hockey player who is currently playing for the Diables Rouges de Briançon of the Ligue Magnus.

Chernook previously played 52 games in the Kontinental Hockey League for HC Dinamo Minsk. He competed in the 2012 and 2013 IIHF World Championship as a member of the Belarus men's national ice hockey team.

References

External links

1986 births
Living people
Belarusian ice hockey defencemen
HC Dinamo Minsk players
Keramin Minsk players
Khimik-SKA Novopolotsk players
MKS Cracovia (ice hockey) players
LHC Les Lions players
People from Navapolatsk
HC Shakhtyor Soligorsk players
Yunost Minsk players
HKM Zvolen players
Sportspeople from Vitebsk Region
Belarusian expatriate sportspeople in Russia
Belarusian expatriate sportspeople in France
Belarusian expatriate sportspeople in Slovakia
Belarusian expatriate sportspeople in Poland
Belarusian expatriate ice hockey people
Expatriate ice hockey players in Slovakia
Expatriate ice hockey players in France
Expatriate ice hockey players in Russia
Expatriate ice hockey players in Poland